A reassurance marker or confirming marker is a type of traffic sign that confirms the identity of the route being traveled on. It does not provide information found on other types of road signs, such as distances traveled, distances to other locations or upcoming intersections, as is done by highway location markers.

It is a highway shield, usually with a cardinal direction sign, that repeats the name or number of the current route.  They are typically posted at intervals alongside a numbered highway.

North America 

In the United States and Canada, reassurance markers (also called reassurance shields or confirming shields) usually take the form of a shield displaying the road number on an elevated pole, with a plate above or below it indicating the "official" direction of that side of the route. (The official long-range direction may differ from the short-range direction; for example, a large stretch of I-90 near Buffalo, New York runs north–south, although the route is officially east–west.) The direction portion of the sign confirms that the driver is going the right way along the desired road.  On larger roads, reassurance markers are sometimes posted on a sign that is elevated on a gantry.

In the United States, reassurance shields are defined in Section 2D.31 of the Manual on Uniform Traffic Control Devices (MUTCD). The MUTCD recommends that reassurance assemblies be placed:

25–200 feet (8–61 m) after intersections of numbered highways
Between intersections in urban areas as needed
After leaving the limits of any incorporated city or town
Periodically in other places for reassurance purposes

The MUTCD requires a cardinal directional sign to be posted with the route shield to further reassure travelers that they are traveling the correct direction on their route. However, this standard is not always followed, especially in urban areas. One example of this is found in the Hampton Roads area of Virginia, where directional signs for Interstate 64 are not posted between the road's eastern terminus in Chesapeake and Interstate 264 in Norfolk, because the road travels in the opposite compass direction from its official designation (although the route in the Norfolk-to-Chesapeake direction is a continuation of I-64 east, it travels westward at that point).

Europe

The Vienna Convention on Road Signs and Signals specifies that "road identification signs" consist of the route number framed in a rectangle, a shield, or the relevant state's route classification symbol (if one exists).   The extent to which such signs are used varies between countries.

In the Republic of Ireland, such signs appear normally on national routes and upgraded regional roads. Officially known as route confirmation signs, there are two variants; the smaller (featuring just the road number) is common after minor junctions, and a full route confirmation sign will feature the route number and several destinations and the distances to them (with distances not directly reached by that particular route number in brackets). Euroroute numbers have begun to appear on these signs but are not yet commonplace. On motorways and high quality dual carriageways, they appear after every junction (except on the M50, on which they are not typically used). On other national roads they appear when leaving built-up areas. Some regional roads feature route confirmation signs, but they are not common on these roads.

In the Netherlands, frequently-positioned  include the route number, the distance in hectometers, and the current speed limit. In some European countries, highway location markers (distance posts similar to milestones) are placed at regular intervals along roadsides. As well as giving the distance to or from one end of the route, these posts include the route number.

See also 

 historical marker
 trail blaze

References

Traffic signs